In Argentina and Uruguay, a ñoqui (English: gnocchi) is a person who is legally registered as a worker, usually for the government, and receives a monthly wage, but who performs little or no work. Such individuals are called ñoquis because many Argentines and Uruguayans traditionally eat noquis on the 29th day of every month, around the time when people receive their monthly paychecks. Additionally, it is a play on words, as the phrase's pronunciation transliterates as "Not Here" in the Spanish Language, or "No Aquí".

People may hold ñoqui positions for several reasons. Some are the recipients of political favors and/or nepotism, while others work to promote partisan agendas instead of performing their nominal duties. Still others are disabled or continue to receive paychecks by mistake, such as the dead, retired, or those who have moved on to other positions. 

A 2015 study by KPMG estimated that 5 to 7 percent of Argentine public sector employees were ñoquis, which would be more than 200,000 individuals each receiving an average monthly salary of 8,000 pesos.

History
Upon taking office as chief of government of Buenos Aires in 2007, Mauricio Macri fired 2,400 city employees who he claimed were ñoquis. This action led to strikes and conflict with the city's unions.

See also 
 Sinecure
 No-show job

References

Corruption in Argentina
Labor in Argentina